The 23rd AVN Awards ceremony, presented by Adult Video News (AVN), honored the best pornographic films of 2005 and took place January 7, 2006 at the Venetian Hotel Grand Ballroom, at Paradise, Nevada, U.S.A. During the ceremony, AVN presented AVN Awards (commonly referred to as Oscars of porn) in 104 categories honoring films released between October 1, 2004, and September 30, 2005. The ceremony, televised in the United States by Playboy TV, was produced and directed by Gary Miller. Comedian Greg Fitzsimmons hosted the show with adult film star Jesse Jane.

The Devil in Miss Jones, a remake of the 1973 classic of the same name, won nine awards including Best Film, but the big winner of the evening was Pirates with 11 awards including Best Video Feature. Other multiple award winners included Camp Cuddly Pines Powertool Massacre and Dark Side with five apiece and Squealer with three. The telecast was subsequently issued on DVD by Spice Studios.

Winners and nominees

The nominees for the 23rd AVN Awards were announced on November 25, 2005, by Adult Video News. Pirates earned the most nominations with 24 total. The Devil in Miss Jones was next with 19, followed by Eternity with 17, Dark Angels 2: Bloodline and Dark Side each with 16 and Catherine with 15.

The winners were announced during the awards ceremony on January 7, 2006. Notably, Pirates set a new record for most awards at one show, edging past Fashionistas, which won 10 in 2003. McKenzie Lee won the coveted Best New Starlet award while Female Performer of the Year was Audrey Hollander. Manuel Ferrara won Male Performer of the Year for the second straight time.

Major awards

Winners are listed first, highlighted in boldface, and indicated with a double dagger.

{| class=wikitable
|-
! style="background:#89cff0" | Best Video Feature
! style="background:#89cff0" | Best Film
|-
| valign="top" |
 Pirates
Catherine
 Contract Girl
 Dark Angels 2: Bloodline
 Drive
 Killing Courtney Luv
 Lexie & Monique Love Rocco
 Lover’s Lane
 The Perfect Secretary
 Porn Star
 Prisoner
 Undertow
| valign="top" |
 The Devil in Miss Jones
 Close-Ups
 Dark Side
 Emotions
 Eternity
 Last Girl Standing
 Les Bitches
 Sentenced
 The Villa
|-
! style="background:#89cff0" | Best High-Definition Production
! style="background:#89cff0" | Best New Starlet
|-
| valign="top" |
 Pirates
 Artcore: Masquerade
 Camp Cuddly Pines Powertool Massacre
 Dark Angels 2: Bloodline
 The Edge Runner
 Hustler’s Taboo 3
 Jaded
 Lover’s Lane
 Many Shades of Mayhem
 Surrender the Booty
 Teenage Dreamin Vamp
| valign="top" |
 McKenzie Lee Lori Alexia
 Joanna Angel
 Jasmine Byrne
 Courtney Cummz
 Brooke Haven
 Jenaveve Jolie
 Sunny Lane
 Tory Lane
 Vanessa Lane
 Trina Michaels
 Keri Sable
 Hillary Scott
 Taryn Thomas
 Kelly Wells
|-
! style="background:#89cff0; width:50%" | Male Performer of the Year
! style="background:#89cff0; width:50%" | Female Performer of the Year
|-
| valign="top" |
 Manuel Ferrara Otto Bauer
 Erik Everhard
 Tommy Gunn
 Kurt Lockwood
 Mr. Marcus
 Sean Michaels
 Mr. Pete
 Randy Spears
 Lexington Steele
 Michael Stefano
 Evan Stone
 Lee Stone
 John Strong
| valign="top" |
 Audrey Hollander Nicki Hunter
 Roxy Jezel
 Ariana Jollee
 Dillan Lauren
 Melissa Lauren
 Missy Monroe
 Gia Paloma
 Lauren Phoenix
 Taylor Rain
 Brittney Skye
 Flower Tucci
 Venus
|-
! style="background:#89cff0" | Best Actor – Video
! style="background:#89cff0" | Best Actress – Video
|-
| valign="top" |
 Evan Stone, Pirates Otto Bauer, Catherine
 Barrett Blade, Dark Angels 2: Bloodline
 Dillon, Dark Angels 2: Bloodline
 Tommy Gunn, AGP: All Girl Protection
 Dean James, Killing Courtney Luv
 Dick Smothers, Jr., Dark Deception
 Randy Spears, One Man’s Obsession
 Steven St. Croix, Undertow
 George Uhl, Robinson Crusoe on Sin Island
| valign="top" |
 Janine, Pirates Kami Andrews, Texas' Asshole Massacre
 Joanna Angel, Joanna’s Angels
 Cindy Crawford, Sodom
 Jessica Drake, One Man’s Obsession
 Audrey Hollander, Catherine
 Jesse Jane, Pirates
 Devinn Lane, Lovers Lane'
 Sunny Lane, Dark Angels 2: Bloodline Kaiya Lee, Shadow of a Geisha Gia Paloma, Wild Things on the Run 2 Olivia Saint, Contract Girl Savanna Samson, Freshness Brittney Skye, Prisoner|-
! style="background:#89cff0" | Best Actor – Film
! style="background:#89cff0" | Best Actress – Film
|-
| valign="top" |
 Randy Spears, Eternity
 Chris Cannon, Scorpio Rising Nick Manning, Les Bitches Alec Metro, Les Bitches Herschel Savage, Dark Side| valign="top" |
 Savanna Samson, The Devil in Miss Jones
 Sunrise Adams, Sentenced Stormy Daniels, Eternity Penny Flame, Dark Side Janine, The Villa Lezley Zen, Les Bitches|-
! colspan="2" style="background:#89cff0" | Best Supporting Actress—Video
|-
| colspan="2" valign="top" |
 Stormy Daniels, Camp Cuddly Pines Powertool Massacre

Nikki Benz, Jack’s Teen America 2Jessica Drake, Camp Cuddly Pines Powertool MassacreAudrey Hollander, Desperate Wives 2Kimberly Kane, PolarityJennifer Luv, Taboo 21Marie Luv, Jack’s Teen America 7Missy Monroe, Debbie Goes to RehabHaley Paige, PrisonerLauren Phoenix, The Edge Runner|-
! style="background:#89cff0" | Best Director – Video
! style="background:#89cff0" | Best Director – Film
|-
| valign="top" |
 Joone, Pirates
 Nic Andrews, Dark Angels 2: Bloodline Brad Armstrong, Lovers Lane David Aaron Clark, Shadow of a Geisha D. Cypher, Prisoner Red Ezra, Taboo 21 Joe Gallant, Killing Courtney Luv Jonathan Morgan, Camp Cuddly Pines Powertool Massacre Michael Ninn, Catherine David Stanley, Perfect Kiss Nicholas Steele, The Edge Runner Paul Thomas, Lexie & Monique Love Rocco| valign="top" |
 Paul Thomas, The Devil in Miss Jones
 Brad Armstrong, Eternity James Avalon, Dark Side Andrew Blake, Close-Ups Chi Chi LaRue, Sentenced|-
! style="background:#89cff0" | Best Gonzo Release
! style="background:#89cff0" | Best Ethnic-Themed Video—Asian
|-
| valign="top" |
 Slut Puppies Born for Porn
 College Guide: How to Get More Pussy
 Ghost Town
 Gob Swappers
 Jack's Playground 20
 Myne Tease 2
 Neo Pornographia
 Otto & Audrey Destroy the World
 Riot Sluts 2
 Service Animals 21
 She Swallows
 Spring Chickens 9
 Take No Prisoners
 Teen Cum Squad
 Welcome to Casa Butts, Again!
| valign="top" |
 Invasian 2 Adult Toy Story 2
 Asians 2
 Cat Sperm Woman
 Diary of a Mad Porn Director
 Kum Pao
 Oriental Orgy World 2
 Poon Tang Clan
 The Reign of Tera: Inside the Asian Love Palace
 Shadow of a Geisha
 Slant Eye for the Straight Guy
 Slanted Holes 2
 Tokyo Hush-Hush Fuckies 2
 Torukeru
 Yellow Fever
|-
! style="background:#89cff0" | Best Couples Sex Scene—Video 
! style="background:#89cff0" | Best Couples Sex Scene—Film
|-
| valign="top" |Brittney Skye, Tommy Gunn, Porn Star Destiny DeVille, Mr. Marcus, Booty Talk 55
 Hillary Scott, Tony T., Butt Blasted!
Flower Tucci, Van Damage, Cheek Freaks
 Katsumi, Manuel Ferrara, Euro Domination 4
 Sarah Blake, Nick Manning, Innocence: Perfect Pink
 Kinzie Kenner, Christian, Jack’s Teen America 6
 Krystal Steal, Eric Masterson, Krystal Method
 Monique Alexander, Rocco Siffredi, Lexie and Monique Love Rocco
 Sandra Romain, Michael Stefano, Mind Fuck
 Boo D. Licious, Talon, Raw Desire
 Dasha, Dillon, Suck, Fuck, Swallow
 Nikki Benz, Jules Jordan, Take No Prisoners
 Tiffany Mynx, Mandingo, Tiffany & Cumpany
 Taryn Thomas, Scott Nails, Vault of Whores
 Taylor Rain, Mr. Pete, The Young and the Raunchy
| valign="top" |Penny Flame, Herschel Savage, Dark Side Savanna Samson, Nick Manning, The Devil in Miss Jones
 Dominica Leoni, Tyce Bune, Emotions
 Stormy Daniels, Randy Spears, Eternity
 Jessica Drake, Tommy Gunn, Sold
 Janine Lindemulder, Dale Dabone, The Villa
|-
! style="background:#89cff0" | Best Anal Sex Scene—Video 
! style="background:#89cff0" | Best Oral Sex Scene—Video 
|-
| valign="top" |Katsumi, Manuel Ferrara, Cumshitters Janet Alfano, Manuel Ferrara, Anal Expedition 6
 Jasmine Byrne, Mark Ashley, Angels of Debauchery 4
 Venus, Marco Duato Ass Quake
 Lanny Barbie, Jules Jordan, Ass Worship 8
Nadia Styles, Kurt Lockwood, Barely Legal Corrupted
 Tiffany Mynx, Tony T., Butt Blassted!
 Audrey Hollander, Otto Bauer, Catherine
 Taylor Rain, Anthony Hardwood, Evil Bitches
 Kat, Magnum, Facial Explosions
 Lauren Phoenix, Anthony Hardwood, Flesh Fest 3
 Tyla Winn, Lee Stone, Give Me Gape 2
 Roxanne Hall, Lexington Steele, Lex Steele XXX 5
 Carmen, Mick Blue, Rapture
 Dillan Lauren, Marco Duato, Raw Desire
 Sandra Romain, Sascha, Semen Demons 2
| valign="top" |Jassie, Kimberly Kane, Scott Lyons, Scott Nails, Kris Slater, Squealer Jamie Brooks, Brian Surewood, Ass Quake
 Katsumi, Jules Jordan, Ass Worship 7,
 Alicia Rhodes, Leo, Big Gulps
 Poppy Morgan, Taryn Thomas, Sascha, Blow Me Sandwich 7
 Tiana Lynn, Mario Cassini, Johnny Fender, Scott Lyon, Brett Rockman, Arnold Schwartzenpecker, Feeding Frenzy 6
 Destiny DeVille, Dick Nasty, Kyle Stone, Chris Mountain, Joe Rock, Glazed & Confused 5
 Katja Kassin, Tony T., I Wanna Get Face Fucked
 Sarah Blake, Eric Masterson, Jack's Playground 24
 Dani Woodward, Brandon Iron, Lick My Balls
 Sativa Rose, Joe Friday, Oral Junkies
 Jesse Jane, Scott Nails, Pirates
 Alektra Blue, Delilah Strong, Jonni Darkko, Suck it Dry
 Jersey Jaxin, Jon Dough, John Strong, Teen Fuck Holes 2
 Gia Paloma, Arnold Schwartzenpecker, Dick Nasty, Face Blaster, Johnny Fender, Jim Beem, Tonsil Train
|-
! style="background:#89cff0" | Best Three-Way Sex Scene
! style="background:#89cff0" | Best All-Girl Sex Scene—Video
|-
| valign="top" |Tyla Winn, Michael Stefano, John Strong, Tease Me Then Please Me 2 Michelle B., Chris Charming, Tony T., Anal Retentive 5
 Heather Gables, Manuel Ferrara, Randy Spears, Choke It Down
 Sandra Romain, Heather Gables, Manuel Ferrara, Cum Fart Cocktails 2
 Renee Pornero, Steve Holmes, Toni Ribas, Cum Guzzlers 4
 Tory Lane, Francesca Lé, Mark Wood, A Different P.O.V.
 Flower Tucci, Angela Stone, Lee Stone, Flower’s Squirt Shower
 Melissa Lauren, Avy Lee Roth, Erik Everhard, Fuck Dolls 3
 Mari Possa, Barbara Summer, Herschel Savage, House of Ass
 Jasmine Byrne, Mario Rossi, Jean Valjean, Innocence: Wild Child
 Jamie Elle, Gigi, Joel Lawrence, Mouth 2 Mouth 2
 Audrey Hollander, Dani Woodward, Alex Rox, Outgunned
 Trina Michaels, Steve Holmes, John Strong, Sex Fiends 2
 Angel Eyes, Olivia O’Lovely, Mr. Marcus, She Got Ass
 McKenzie Lee, Jules Jordan, Mark Wood, Slut Puppies
| valign="top" |Janine, Jesse Jane, Pirates Audrey Hollander, Melissa Lauren, Venus, Babes Illustrated 15
 Melissa Lauren, Sandra Romain, Be My Bitch
 Brooke Haven, Taylor Kurtis, Missy Monroe, Staci Thorn, Big Toys No Boys 3
 Nikki Blond, Audrey Hollander, Adriana Rouso, Catherine
 Cytherea, Sandra Romain, Cousin Stevie’s Pussy Party 7,
 Kimberly Kane, Katrina Kraven, Kylie Ireland, Julie Night, Lauren Phoenix, Epiphany
 Alexia, Gigi, Kaylynn, Mackenzie Mack, Kirsten Price, Sammie Rhodes, Celeste Star, Lexxi Taylor, Girlvana
 Katrina Kraven, Avy Lee Roth, Gothsend 2
 Justine Joli, Jade Starr, Kill Girl Kill 2
 Jenna Jameson, Krystal Steal, Krystal Method
 Roxy Jezel, Katja Kassin, My Ass Is Haunted
 Jesse Jane, Carmen Luvana, Pirates
 Tiana Lynn, Sammie Rhodes, Dani Woodward, Supersquirt 2
..3** Mari Possa, Samantha Ryan, Selena Silver, Flower Tucci, War of the Girls
|}

 Additional Award Winners 
These awards were announced, but not presented, in two pre-recorded winners-only segments during the event. Trophies were given to the recipients off-stage:DIRECTOR AWARDS Best Director - Foreign Release: Rocco Siffredi, Who Fucked Rocco?
 Best Director - Non-Feature: Michael Ninn, Neo PornographiaMARKETING AWARDS Best New Video Production Company: Swank Digital
 Best On-Line Marketing Campaign: PiratesXXX.com, Digital Playground/Adam & Eve
 Best Overall Marketing Campaign – Company Image: ClubJenna
 Best Overall Marketing Campaign – Individual Project: Mary Carey's Dinner with President Bush, Kick Ass Pictures
 Best Packaging: Catherine
 Best Retail Website – Rentals: WantedList.com
 Best Retail Website – Sales: AdultDVDEmpire.com
 Top Renting Title of the Year: The Masseuse (2004 remake)
 Top Selling Title of the Year: 1 Night in ChinaPERFORMER AWARDS Best Male Newcomer: Scott Nails
 Best Non-Sex Performance: William Margold, Dark Side
 Best Supporting Actor–Film: Randy Spears, Dark Side
 Best Supporting Actor–Video: Tommy Gunn, Pirates
 Best Supporting Actress–Film: Jenna Jameson, The Devil in Miss Jones
 Best Tease Performance: Katsumi, Ass Worship 7
 Crossover Star of the Year: Jenna Jameson
 Female Foreign Performer of the Year: Katsumi
 Male Foreign Performer of the Year: Steve Holmes
 Transsexual Performer of the Year: Gia DarlingPRODUCTION AWARDS Best All-Girl Release: Belladonna's Fucking Girls
 Best All-Girl Series: Cousin Stevie's Pussy Party
 Best All-Sex Release: Squealer
 Best Alternative Release: Pornomation
 Best Amateur Release: BangBus 6
 Best Amateur Series: BangBus
 Best Anal-Themed Release: Ass Worship 7
 Best Anal-Themed Series: Big Wet Asses
 Best Classic Release on DVD: Ginger Lynn: The Movie
 Best Continuing Video Series: Girlvert
 Best DVD: Pirates, FX
 Best Ethnic-Themed Video–Black: Big Ass Party
 Best Ethnic-Themed Video–Latin: Caliente
 Best Ethnic-Themed Series: Black Reign
 Best Foreign All-Sex Release: Cabaret Bizarre
 Best Foreign All-Sex Series: Euro Domination
 Best Foreign Feature: Robinson Crusoe on Sin Island
 Best Gonzo Series: Service Animals
 Best Interactive DVD: Virtual Katsumi
 Best Interracial Release: Lex Steele XXX 5
 Best Mainstream Adult Release: Inside Deep Throat
 Best Oral-Themed Release: Blow Me Sandwich 7
 Best Oral-Themed Series: Glazed and Confused
 Best POV Release: Manuel Ferrara's POV
 Best Pro-Am Release: Rocco's Initiations 9
 Best Pro-Am Series: Midnight ProwlProduction (ctd.) Best Sex Comedy: Camp Cuddly Pines Powertool Massacre
 Best Vignette Release: Vault of Whores
 Best Vignette Series: GrudgefuckSEX SCENE AWARDS Best All-Girl Sex Scene–Film: Jenna Jameson, Savanna Samson, The Devil in Miss Jones
 Best Anal Sex Scene–Film: Audrey Hollander, Otto Bauer, Sentenced
 Best Group Sex Scene–Film: Alicia Alighatti, Penny Flame, Dillan Lauren, Hillary Scott, Randy Spears, John West, Dark Side
 Best Group Sex Scene–Video: Smokey Flame, Audrey Hollander, Jassie, Kimberly Kane, Otto Bauer, Scott Lyons, Kris Slater, Scott Nails, Squealer
 Best Oral Sex Scene–Film: Alicia Alighatti, Hillary Scott, Randy Spears, Dark Side
 Best Sex Scene in a Foreign-Shot Production: Sandra Romain, Jean-Yves Le Castel, Kid Jamaica, Nick Lang, Euro Domination
 Best Solo Sex Scene: Katja Kassin, Anal Showdown
 Most Outrageous Sex Scene: Joanna Angel in "Blood, Disembowelment, and Fucking...What Fun...", Re-PenetratorSPECIALTY AWARDS Best Solo Release: Blu Dreams
 Best Specialty Release–Big Bust: Faster Pussycat! Fuck! Fuck!
 Best Specialty Release–BDSM: Jenna Loves Pain
 Best Specialty Release–Fem-Dom Strap-On: His Ass is Mine
 Best Specialty Release–Foot Fetish: Coxxx and Soxxx 4
 Best Specialty Release–MILF: MILF Seeker
 Best Specialty Release–Other Genre: Chunky Housecall Nurses 2
 Best Specialty Release–Spanking: A Submissive Mind
 Best Specialty Release–Squirting: Flower's Squirt Shower 2
 Best Transsexual Release: Rogue Adventures 24
 Best Specialty Series: Cum DrippersTECHNICAL AWARDS Best Art Direction–Film: The Devil in Miss Jones
 Best Art Direction–Video: Catherine
 Best Cinematography: Ralph Parfait, The Devil in Miss Jones
 Best DVD Extras: Camp Cuddly Pines Powertool Massacre
 Best DVD Menus: Camp Cuddly Pines Powertool Massacre
 Best Editing–Film: Sonny Malone, The Devil in Miss Jones
 Best Editing–Video: Dark Angels 2: Bloodline
 Best Music: Skin Muzik, Pirates
 Best Screenplay–Film: Dean Nash, Raven Touchstone, The Devil in Miss Jones
 Best Screenplay–Video: Stormy Daniels, Jonathan Morgan, August Warwick, Camp Cuddly Pines Powertool Massacre
 Best Special Effects: FX, Pirates
 Best Videography: Nic Andrews, Dark Angels 2: Bloodline

 Honorary AVN Awards 

Reuben Sturman Award
 Robert Zicari and Janet Zicari, Extreme Associates

Special Achievement Award
 The Fashionistas Live Show, John Stagliano

Hall of Fame
AVN Hall of Fame inductees for 2006 were: Chloe, Nick East, Mickey G., Steve Hatcher, Janet Jacme, Jenna Jameson, Lynn LeMay, Cara Lott, Cash Markman, Rodney Moore, Jack Remy, Stephanie Swift, Jerome Tanner
 Founders Branch:' Norman Arno, VCX; Noel Bloom, Swedish Erotica/Caballero Home Video; Larry Flynt, Hustler

Multiple nominations and awards

The following releases received the most nominations.

 The following 10 releases received multiple awards:

Presenters and performers
The following individuals presented awards or performed musical numbers or comedy sketches.

Presenters (in order of appearance)

Performers

Ceremony information

Several new categories debuted, including Crossover Star of the Year (for impact in mainstream media), Best New Video Production Company and several Specialty genre awards. Meanwhile, multiple packaging categories were condensed into one Best Packaging award due to the demise of VHS as a video format.High Society magazine and Reuters reported the event's attendance record was shattered as more than 5,000 people watched the show.

Performance of year's movies1 Night in China was announced as the top selling movie and the 2004 remake of The Masseuse as the top renting movie of the previous year.

Critical reviewsHigh Society (magazine)|High Society'' termed the event a "smashing success."

See also

 AVN Award
 AVN Best New Starlet Award
 AVN Award for Male Performer of the Year
 AVN Award for Male Foreign Performer of the Year
 AVN Female Performer of the Year Award
 List of members of the AVN Hall of Fame
 2006 GayVN Awards

Notes

References

External links

 
 2006 AVN Award nominees (archived at Wayback Machine, November 26, 2005)
 Adult Video News Awards  at the Internet Movie Database
 
 
 

AVN Awards
2005 film awards